Ignazio "Nat" Curcuruto (October 1, 1903 – April 16, 1975), better known by his stage name Joe Kirk, was an American radio, film, and television actor who was best known for playing the role of Mr. Bacciagalupe on The Abbott and Costello Show.
He was married to Lou Costello's sister Marie in real life.

Early life and career 
Kirk was born Ignazio Curcuruto (known as Nat to his family) in New York City, one of four children—Letitia, Philip (1902–95), Nat (1903–75) and Josephine—of Italian immigrants from Sicily, Giuseppe "Joe" Curcuruto and Elvira Puglisi Curcuruto (1882–1977).

He got his professional start in vaudeville, where he worked as a master of ceremonies and a comedian during the 1930s.

Radio career 
Kirk was a regular voice actor on Abbott and Costello's radio show during World War II and the postwar era of the 1940s. In addition to his ongoing—and best-known—role as Mr. Bacciagalupe, the highly excitable Italian neighbor, Kirk played many other bit parts on the show as well.

As Mr. Bacciagalupe, Kirk spoke with a thick Sicilian-American accent; his surname as well was pronounced in the Sicilian manner and not in proper Italian. When excited, Mr. Bacciagalupe frequently made improvized asides in the Italian language, which were obviously appreciated by many in the audience. Lou Costello, who was Italian-American himself, also understood these side remarks, and sometimes could not stay in character but laughed along as well.

Television career 
In 1952 Kirk brought the popular role of Mr. Bacciagalupe to the television version of The Abbott and Costello Show. Kirk's friendly, mustachioed character held a variety of jobs. At various points in the show, he was a barber, grocer, fruit vendor, ice cream vendor, peanut vendor, bakery owner and music store salesman.

In the episodes featuring his character, Mr. Bacciagalupe would often show impatience with the indecision portrayed by Lou Costello, whom he called by his Sicilian name, Luigi. As he "lost his temperature", Mr. Bacciagalupe would lapse into broken Italian phrases and increasingly animated gesticulation to express his frustration. Sometimes he would find his place of business wrecked by Abbott and Costello's antics; at other times he would confound them completely and they would retreat in confusion as he crowed in triumph.

Kirk's Mr. Bacciagalupe character appeared in 15 of the 26 episodes in the show's first season, 1952–53. In all, he appeared in 19 episodes of the show's 52 total episodes through its end in 1954.

Film career 
The bulk of Kirk's early film career consisted of playing bit parts, often uncredited, in low-budget productions. Typical roles for him were "ethnic" Sicilian-Americans – gangsters, bartenders, bookies and henchmen. He appeared in several films produced by low-budget studio Monogram Pictures, including Spooks Run Wild (1941), Mr. Wise Guy (1942) and Smart Alecks (1942). Kirk appeared as the villager Schwartz in Universal's House of Frankenstein (1944). He was occasionally billed as Joseph I. Kirk, the "I" standing for his birth-name, Ignazio.

Through his marriage to Marie Cristillo, the sister of Lou Costello, Kirk secured steady appearances (albeit in small roles) in Abbott and Costello films. His more prominent parts included the pet shop owner in Rio Rita (1942), Honest Dan the Bookie in Here Come the Co-Eds (1946), the shady real estate agent in Buck Privates Come Home (1947), an uncredited bystander in "Abbott and Costello Meet Frankenstein" (1948) and Dr. Orvilla in Abbott and Costello Go to Mars (1953).

Kirk continued acting through the late 1950s, with appearances in The Jackie Robinson Story (1950), the 1956 Bowery Boys comedy Hot Shots and Fritz Lang's drama Beyond a Reasonable Doubt (1956). He also took small roles in television shows such as Adventures of Superman, Sheriff of Cochise and U.S. Marshal, before retiring from show business in 1958.

Personal life 
Kirk was married to Marie Katherine Cristillo (1912–88), who was the sister of Lou Costello and daughter of producer Sebastian Cristillo. After their marriage, Marie was known interchangeably as Marie Curcuruto or Marie Kirk. The couple had two sons.

He was the great-uncle of actress Marki Costello, who is the granddaughter of Lou Costello.

Filmography

References

External links 
 
 

1903 births
1975 deaths
American male radio actors
American male film actors
American male television actors
Male actors from New York City
American people of Italian descent
20th-century American male actors